The 2006–07 season is the 11th season of Sun Hei SC in Hong Kong First Division League. The team was coached by Malaysian coach Koo Luam Khen.

Squad statistics

Statistics accurate as of match played 31 May 2007

Matches

Competitive

References

Sun Hei SC seasons
Sun Hei